Carlos Chávez Gordón (4 November 1928 – 2 June 2006) was a Panamanian weightlifter. He competed in the men's featherweight event at the 1952 Summer Olympics.

References

1928 births
2006 deaths
Panamanian male weightlifters
Olympic weightlifters of Panama
Weightlifters at the 1952 Summer Olympics
Pan American Games medalists in weightlifting
Pan American Games gold medalists for Panama
Weightlifters at the 1955 Pan American Games
20th-century Panamanian people
21st-century Panamanian people